Joan Ferraté i Soler is a Spanish poet, critic and translator. He studied classical languages at the University of Barcelona, and lived abroad for a few years, teaching in Cuba and then in Canada. He served as the literary director of Seix Barral between 1970 and 1973. Ferrate has published widely across many genres: poetry, essays, biography, literary criticism. As a translator, he is best known for his translations of classical Greek poetry and of the complete poems of Cavafy. He won the 1979 Premio Crítica Serra d’Or for his volume of Cavafy translations, titled Vuitanta-vuit poemes.

He is the brother of the famed Catalan poet Gabriel Ferrater.

References

Spanish poets